Pierre Gaudot (born 2 April 1928) was a French racing cyclist. He rode in the 1952 Tour de France.

References

1928 births
Possibly living people
French male cyclists
Place of birth missing (living people)